The white-eyed foliage-gleaner (Automolus leucophthalmus) is a species of bird in the family Furnariidae. It is found in forests and old second growth in south-eastern Brazil, eastern Paraguay and far north-eastern Argentina. Until recently, it included the Pernambuco foliage-gleaner as a subspecies.

References

 Zimmer, K. J. (2008). The White-eyed Foliage-gleaner (Furnariidae: Automolus) is two species. Wilson Journal of Ornithology 120: 10–25.

white-eyed foliage-gleaner
Birds of Brazil
Birds of the Atlantic Forest
white-eyed foliage-gleaner
Taxonomy articles created by Polbot